Crocodylus raninus, the Borneo crocodile, is an enigmatic species of freshwater crocodile endemic to the Southeast Asian island of Borneo. Its taxonomic status is controversial and unclear: it has been considered by some authors as a synonym of Crocodylus porosus, although a redescription in 1990 and 1992 presented evidence of distinct identity. Currently it is considered to have been misidentified C. porosus or C. siamensis

References

Further reading
Müller S, Schlegel H. 1844. Over de Krokodillen van den Indischen Archipel. 28 pp + Plates 1–3. In Temminck CJ. 1839–1844. Verhandelingen over de natuurlijke geschiedenis der Nederlandsche overzeesche bezittingen, door de leden der Natuurkundige Commissie in Indië en andere Schrijvers. Leiden. 259 pp. + Plates 1-70. (Crocodilus biporcatus raninus, new subspecies). (in Dutch).

External links
 Crocodylus raninus account at The Reptile Database.

Crocodylidae
Reptiles of Borneo
Reptiles described in 1844
Crocodilians of Asia